Henry Holmes may refer to:

 Henry Holmes (died 1738), English Member of Parliament for Yarmouth (Isle of Wight)
 Henry Holmes (composer) (1839–1905), English composer and violinist
 Henry Holmes (British Army officer) (1703–1762), MP for Yarmouth
 Henry Holmes (Northern Ireland politician) (1912–1992), MP in the Northern Ireland Parliament for Belfast Shankill
 Henry Holmes (Confederate soldier) (1827–1865), commanded a detachment of Confederate soldiers during the Battle of Picacho Pass
 Henry Holmes (cricketer) (1833–1913), English cricketer
 H. Allen Holmes (born 1933), American diplomat
 H. H. Holmes (1861–1896),  known as Dr. Henry Howard Holmes, American serial killer

See also
Harry Holmes (disambiguation)
Henry Holmes Smith (1909–1986), photographer